"Whiketywhack (I Ain't Coming Back)" is a song by Danish pop singer Christine Milton. It was released on 7 July 2003 as the second single from her debut album Friday.

Track listing

Credits and personnel
 Written by Remee, Mich Hansen, Joe Belmaati
 Producer on track 1 and 5: Cutfather & Joe for XL Talent Partnership
 Recorded by Joe Belmaati at C&J Studio, Copenhagen
 Mixed by Mads Nilsson, Cutfather & Joe at Whiteroom Studio, Copenhagen
 Percussion by Mich Hansen
 All other instruments by Joe Belmaati
 Backing vocals by Szhirley Rasmussen
 Producer, recording and mixing on track 2: Remee and The Shack at www.studioc4.dk
 Executive remix production on track 4 by emu for Gheespot Productions
 Rap and backing vocals on all tracks by Remee

Charts

References

External links
Whiketywhack (I Ain't Coming Back) at Discogs

2003 singles
Christine Milton songs
Songs written by Remee
Songs written by Cutfather
Song recordings produced by Cutfather & Joe
2003 songs